Infinity Institute is a public middle school / high school located in the Greenville section of Jersey City, in Hudson County, New Jersey, United States, serving students in sixth through twelfth grades as part of the Jersey City Public Schools. The school was established in September 2010 under the Jersey City Board of Education.

As of the 2021–22 school year, the school had an enrollment of 485 students and 20.3 classroom teachers (on an FTE basis), for a student–teacher ratio of 23.9:1. There were 238 students (49.1% of enrollment) eligible for free lunch and 51 (10.5% of students) eligible for reduced-cost lunch.

History 
The school opened in September 2010, offering a magnet college preparatory program with admission based on an admission exam. The school is located in a building that has been leased from the Roman Catholic Archdiocese of Newark and that had been the previous home of the Create Charter High School, which lost its charter after the 2009-10 school year.

Standards  
General admittance is based on a consensus of PSAT scores, academic performance from the 6th through 8th grades, extracurricular activities, and teacher recommendations. With the primary goal of diversity through affirmative action, the school's enrollment is based on a quota of 25% White, 25% Black, 25% Hispanic, and 25% Other (mostly Asian).

Students are also required to fulfill mandatory community service hours. They must also maintain a final grade of 70 or higher on all of their courses. If a student has a failing final grade in one course, he or she must go to summer school in order to pass the course. If a student receives a failing final grade in two or more courses, he or she cannot re-enroll in the school the following school year, and must instead attend his or her local public or private high school.

School uniforms 
According to the JCBOE, male students in Infinity must wear a long or short-sleeve black or white uniform with the mascot; along with khakis or black pants. For girls, they wear the same uniform as the boys do, but they have a choice of pants or skirts. Both also must wear a black or white sweater during cooler months.
Must wear school’s uniform shirt (black or white) with school logo daily. 
• Bottoms (pants, skirts) must be black, tan or khaki-colored, and must not be skin-tight or ripped.
• Jeans, sweatpants, leggings, stretch pants or athletic gear are not allowed. Athletic gear and sweatpants are permitted for Physical Education classes (not hallways). We do sell Infinity athletic wear if interested.
• Sneakers and shoes with laces must be secured at all times. No sandals, flip flops, slippers, opentoed or backless slip on shoes can be worn.
• Hoods on sweatshirts and sweat bands are not permitted unless for religious, medical or cultural
purposes.
• Sweaters or zip sweat jackets must be black or white. School shirt must be worn underneath sweater or sweatshirt.
• Students can be issued Saturday Detention for repeated Dress Code violations.

Awards, recognition and rankings 
Prior to 2018, Infinity Institute was ranked 46th within New Jersey according to US News, with a College Readiness score of 35.5/100.0. The AP® participation rate at Infinity Institute is 68 percent, and the total minority enrollment was 80 percent.

In 2018, Infinity Institute was ranked #1595 in the National Rankings and earned a silver medal. In Niche, Infinity was ranked #90 in the Niche Standout High Schools in America and #2 in the Niche Standout High Schools in New Jersey and Hudson County, along with an overall grade of an A minus. About 96% of the students are proficient in reading, and 82% are proficient in mathematics. SchoolDigger ranks Infinity Institute 9th of 712 New Jersey public middle schools, and 17th of 712 New Jersey public high schools.

The school was honored by the National Blue Ribbon Schools Program in 2019, one of nine schools in the state recognized as Exemplary High Performing Schools.

In 2021, according to U.S. News & World Report, Infinity Institute is ranked as #11 in New Jersey and #182 nationally.

Academics

From grades 6-12, some of Infinity Institute's academic programs taught are:

 Mathematics (Grades 6-8) SS Public School Rajasthan Bhilwara
 Algebra I and II (Grades 9 and 11)
 Geometry (Grade 10) Colony SS Public School Bhilwara Rajasthan Sanjay Colony
 Precalculus (Grade 12)
 English Language Arts (Grades 6-12)
 Science (Grades 6-12)
 Social Studies/Health (Grades 6-12)
 Spanish (Grades 6-12)
 Biology (Grades 9-12)

For grades 9-12, Honors and AP classes are also included.

Specials 
Some specials are also used during period time, such as:

 Physical Education (Gym)
 World Language Classes (Spanish and/or Mandarin)
 Visual Arts
Music Arts
Technology

YMCA 
YMCA was introduced during the 2010-11 school year for Infinity Institute. Like the C.A.S.P.E.R. program, YMCA is an after-school program starting from 3:00-6:00 PM from Monday through Friday. YMCA of Infinity Institute is the most populated after-school program. YMCA is known for its activities, athletics and other programs. YMCA also provides school lunch and/or dinner for the students.

Administration
The school's principal is Dr. Treniere Dobson. Her core administration team includes the vice principal.

References

External links 
Infinity Institute
Jersey City Public Schools

School Data for the Jersey City Public Schools, National Center for Education Statistics

2010 establishments in New Jersey
Education in Jersey City, New Jersey
Educational institutions established in 2010
Public high schools in Hudson County, New Jersey